The DJI Phantom is a series of unmanned aerial vehicles (UAVs) developed by Chinese technology company DJI. DJI Phantom devices were released between 2013–2019.

Technical specs 
The DJI Phantom drones have mostly similar technical properties.
These are the specs for the Vision+ model:
 Start weight: 1242 g
 Motor-motor distance (diagonal): 350mm
 Battery: 5200 mAh Lipo
 Max. ascent and descent speed: 6 m/s
 Motor: 920 Kv, Configuration 12N/14P, Maximum Output Power 140 W, size 28x24 mm, weight 50g

Phantom 1 Series 
The Phantom 1, originally known as Phantom, was released in January 7th 2013. It used 2.4  GHz for control.  It was commonly equipped with a GoPro camera for amateur filmmaking or photography.  Its battery life was around 10 minutes with a GoPro. Uses Lithium Polymer batteries.

Phantom 2 Series 

The (straight) Phantom 2 was released in December 2013 after the Phantom 2 Vision. It uses 2.4 GHz for control and doesn't include a camera.  A Zenmuse gimbal could be purchased with the Phantom 2, or it could be added later.  The Zenmuse gimbal was made to hold cameras such as the GoPro.  Its configuration allows users two axes for a better level shot.   Its controller also allowed manual remote up/down tilt of the camera.

Vision 

Released in October 2013, it was the first of the Phantom 2 series to be released, and featured significant upgrades over the original Phantom.  It included a one-dimensional gimbal and an HD camera with a 4 GB micro SD card, a built-in anti-vibration mount, advanced Wi-Fi module, a GPS-enabled position holding, return-to-home capability, an improved Naza flight control system, and self-tightening propellers. Upgrades over the original Phantom include auto-return, increased flight speed, increased flight time and controllable range, increased battery capacity, and smart phone or tablet connection capability. It later became compatible with a ground station and iOS or Android devices.  It was the first DJI aircraft to be released with the "Intelligent Li-Po battery" which enabled flight times of almost 20 minutes.  It also featured a "Range Extender" device on the controller which worked as a relay/amplifier for the wifi FPV signal between the aircraft and the controller, thereby increasing signal strength and range.

Vision+ 

In the fall of 2014, the Phantom 2 Vision+ V3.0 was released which included significant improvements such as more powerful 2312/960kv motors vs 2212/920kv, better designed motor internals - such as the double-layer single-wire stator for improved efficiency, impact resistant motor bearings, dial on controller to adjust gimbal pitch, rechargeable lipo battery upgrade on controller, a trainer port on controller, enclosed water-resistant compass with thicker insulated cable, extra shielding for the GPS module, new 9450 prop upgrade (from 9443), prop threads changed from metal to composite (less risk of spin-off), harder less-flexible props.  Later releases of the 3.0 included an aerated wifi module case to aid in cooling for reduced failure rate and upgraded ESC v2.1 (featuring 4.06 firmware vice the older 4.02 firmware).

The Phantom 2 Vision+, released in July 2014, added a three-axis stabilizer. It had a slightly increased range.  It included the same FC200 camera as the earlier released Phantom 2 Vision, but in a completely different enclosure.  The wifi module was moved from the camera case to the aircraft's centerboard which unfortunately weakened the aircraft's ability to receive GPS relative to the P2V due to EMF emanating from the module.  The wifi patch antennas were moved from the camera case to the sides of the aircraft on either side of the battery. It received a no-fly zone software-implanted, warning the user of places where not to fly (ex. airports).

FC40 

The Phantom (Flying Camera) FC40, was an upgrade from the Phantom 1 as it included a gimbal-less camera. The aircraft used 5.8 GHz for control allowing 2.4 GHz to be used for wifi FPV.  It is equipped with an iOS/Android app control, Wi-Fi and GPS modules. Using a 2.4 GHz Wi-Fi connection, it helps its pilot follow in real time via aerial pictures on a mobile device. However, FPV range was limited by the signal strength of the mobile device as the connection between the two was direct.  The camera angle is manually set before the flight. The mount can also be used to attached a GoPro camera to the unit as well.

Phantom 3 Series 

The Phantom 3, released in April 2015, adds built-in lightbridge downlink, that gives the controller a maximum range of 4800 meters (3 miles), and the visual positioning system, that allows the Phantom 3 to better maintain its position at lower altitudes and even indoors where GPS is weak or unavailable. The remote for Professional and Advanced models also has 2 antennas.

There are five models of the Phantom 3:

Standard 
The Standard was released in August 2015. It features 2.7K video recording. The standard is the basic model without lightbridge, instead it uses WiFi to transmit video and telemetry with a limited range compared to the Advanced and Professional models, and no vision positioning systems. It includes features, as the other models do, such as Point of Interest, Follow Me, GPS Waypoints, Course Lock and Home Lock. For higher end needs one has to select a Phantom 4 model.

Professional 
Records in 4K, and includes a 100 W fast charger. Remote Controller with [optional HDMI out] and USB in for tablets and smartphones to connect to the controller. A bigger clamp also allows this remote to hold up to a 9.7inch iPad.

Advanced 
Records in 2.7K and includes a 57 W charger. Remote Controller with optional HDMI out and USB in for tablets and smartphones to connect to controller. The remote also is big enough to hold a 9.7 inch iPad.

4K 
The 4K was released in early 2016. Although both the controller and the aircraft appear to look similar to the Phantom 3 Advanced/Professional, the system is very much like the Phantom 3 Standard in that it uses 5.8 GHz for control and uses a 2.4 GHz wifi signal for FPV and telemetry.  The range is slightly improved.  The controller lacks HDMI / USB ports.  The aircraft includes the Visual Positioning System module seen on the Professional/Advanced models.

SE 

The SE was originally released in China and for several months was unavailable elsewhere in the world.  It became available in North America in August 2017.  It was aptly named a "Special Edition" as it is unlike any other aircraft in the Phantom line.  Although DJI claims it uses "improved ... Wifi", the system between the controller and the aircraft is more like DJI's Lightbridge signals.  The controller converts the data to wifi to allow communication with a mobile device without an attached cable.  The active antennas on the controller which communicate with the Phantom are patch antennas hidden inside the controller - one is strictly for transmission and the other is strictly for receiving - which is how the Lightbridge system works.  The visible antenna on the outside of the controller is used only to communicate with the mobile device.  It has a maximum transmission range of up to 2.5 mi (4 km) in FCC mode, and it has a 4K video camera

Phantom 4 Series 

The Phantom 4, released in March 2016, introduces a safer and better quick release propeller system. It also improves usability by adding obstacle avoidance and an ability to track subjects (ActiveTrack), thanks to its five sensors. Some of its features include GPS, GLONASS, sonar, five separate safety sensors, a camera gimbal, gyroscope, and more. It is slightly bigger and heavier than the Phantom 3 due to a larger battery, but it still maintains a longer flight time and greater top speed.
The controller and camera are very similar to Phantom 3 Pro

The maximum video transmission technology on the Phantom 4 is same as the ones on Phantom 3 Pro and Adv, which is Lightbridge 2, it has a maximum FCC flying range of 5 km.

On April 13, 2017 DJI announced the launch of the Phantom 4 Advanced and the end of the Phantom 4's lifespan for April 30, 2017.

Phantom 4 Pro 

DJI Phantom 4 Pro, released in November 2016, has a three-axis stabilized camera with a  20 MP CMOS sensor FC6310.
It upgrades its obstacle avoidance with five directional sensors. The Phantom 4 Pro offers two remote controllers, one with a dedicated screen (Phantom 4 Pro+) and one without. It integrates an upgraded Lightbridge HD video transmission system that adds 5.8 GHz transmission support and a maximum downlink video transmission range of 7 km.
In addition - DJI released a set of Goggles, which can be used with various DJI equipment, including the Phantom 4 Pro, to allow for First Person View (FPV) flying.

Phantom 4 Advanced 
Announced on April 13, 2017, the Phantom 4 Advanced uses the same camera sensor as the Phantom 4 Pro. Designed to replace the original Phantom 4, the Phantom 4 Advanced uses the 2.4 GHz frequency band, the rear vision sensors and two infrared sensors in the FlightAutonomy system in comparison to the Phantom 4 Pro model. It was shipped on April 30, 2017.

It June 2017 it was priced in line with the original Phantom 4.

Phantom 4 Pro Obsidian 
Announced at the 2017 IFA trade show, it gives the option to have the Phantom 4 Pro painted in obsidian black. Some build quality upgrades are included with the camera gimbal being made of magnesium.

Phantom 4 Pro V2.0 
The DJI Phantom 4 Pro V2.0, announced in May 2018, improves on the existing Phantom 4 Pro with an OcuSync transmission system, improved ESCs and low-noise propellers. It was relaunched in January 2020.

It uses the same camera as the first iteration of the Phantom 4 Pro.

This edition also features expanded Flight Autonomy with 5-direction obstacle sensing and 4-direction obstacle avoidance. It's also the very first DJI drone to feature an infrared sensing system.

Phantom 4 RTK 

The DJI Phantom 4 RTK, released in October 2018, was designed for extremely accurate aerial mapping using real-time kinematic positioning.  In addition to RTK, it uses a redundant GNSS module, installed to maintain flight stability in signal-poor regions such as dense cities.

According to DJI P4RTK (2019) camera FC6310R is identical to Phantom 4 pro's but has a glass lens instead a plastic one. Phantom 4 RTK records images only in jpg format.

Phantom 4 Multispectral 

The DJI Phantom 4 Multispectral, released in September 2019, integrates a 6 RGB camera sensor and multispectral imaging system for precise data for smart agriculture. It allows users to gain access to environmental impacts and changes for agricultural aspects. Also, with the RTK module attached, the Phantom 4 Multispectral is able to use centimeter level accurate positioning system.

Comparisons

Applications 

Several segments of industry are open to commercial use including drone journalism, hurricane hunting, 3-D landscape mapping, nature protection, farming, search and rescue, aircraft inspection, tornado chasing, and lava lake exploration.
Drones are also in entertainment and business. The Fox Broadcasting Company used Phantom 2 Vision+'s to promote 24 during San Diego Comic-Con International 2014.

The DJI Phantom has been allegedly weaponized by ISIS in Syria and Iraq and used to scout for battle planning, spot for artillery, navigate car bombs, and conduct aerial bombing by dropping rigged grenade/mortar shell on enemy troops. The small size and agile flight performance make these improvised drones very difficult to spot and destroy.

Reception 
The Phantom series have been popular with hobbyists because of its consumer-friendly appearance and ease of use.  Phantom UAVs have made dramatic appearances at the Consumer Electronics Show (CES) for several years. Despite US sanctions on DJI, the FBI has continued to order Phantom 4 Pros (P4P), citing in a procurement justification that 'the DJI P4P is the only commercially available consumer sUAV to combine ease of use, high camera resolution and obstacle avoidance at an acceptable cost.'

Market Trends 
In 2017, the U.S. FAA estimated 'hobbyist' drones reaching between 2.75 million and 4.5 million units by 2021. As of 2018, DJI controlled an estimated 74% of the global consumer drone market, with no other company controlling more than 5%.

See also 
 DJI Mavic
 Delivery drone
 Miniature UAV
 History of unmanned aerial vehicles
 List of unmanned aerial vehicles

References

External links 
 

Unmanned aerial vehicles of China
Quadrotors
Unmanned helicopters
Radio-controlled helicopters
2010s fads and trends
Articles containing video clips
DJI